Mary Louella Trescott (1861–1935) was a legal rights attorney and the first woman appointed to local, state, and Federal judicial positions in Luzerne County, Pennsylvania. Trescott's education and positions were achieved before 1920 when ratification of the 19th Amendment granted American women the right to vote.

Birth and family 
Mary Luella Trescott born in 1861 in Pennsylvania to Miller Barton Trescott and Permelia Stevens. She used variations of her name Mary L. Trescott and M. L. Trescott. She was a woman attorney and held offices in Luzerne County, Pennsylvania. She died in 1935.

Education 
Trescott attended Eastman Business College in Poughkeepsie, New York, graduating in 1893. She studied law in the offices of Henry W. Palmer. She was admitted to the bar in Luzerne County on October 14, 1895.

Notable legal case 
On October 28, 1894 a house known as the "Hungarian Shanty" was destroyed in a dynamite explosion, killing 3 occupants and injuring 8 others. Arrests were made of five African American suspects in June 1895, including Hester Brace and Sarah Miller, wives of two of the male suspects. The women were still in jail in 1897 and had not been brought to trial when Trescott became interested in their case.  Trescott took on the representation of the women and successfully filed Habeas corpus pleadings to obtain their release in March 1897.

First woman to hold local, state and federal judicial positions 
In Trescott's 1927 campaign for a seat as a judge she touted that she was the first woman from Luzerne County to hold the following positions:

Elected school director in Wilkes-Barre, Pennsylvania in 1912

Admitted to the Luzerne County Bar

Admitted to practice in the Supreme Court of Pennsylvania (1901)

Admitted to practice in the Federal District Court

Admitted to practice in the Supreme Court of the United States

Held position as referee in the United States bankruptcy court (1921)

References 

1861 births
1935 deaths
American women lawyers
Eastman Business College alumni
Pennsylvania lawyers